The Arnst River in New Zealand is a tributary of the Travers River, which itself flows into Lake Rotoiti, in Nelson Lakes National Park.

The park is at the northern end of the South Island of New Zealand. The Arnst River is named after the champion rower Jacob Diedrich Arnst, known as Richard Arnst or Dick Arnst.

Reference

Rivers of the Tasman District
Rivers of New Zealand